Abu Zayn Kahhal was a 15th-century Persian physician. Not much is known about his life. He lived during the era of Timurid Shahrukh and went to Herat during his reign. His name, Kahhal means "oculist". He is the author of a medieval medical text named "Sharayet-i Jarrahi" ("Surgical Requirements") which he dedicated to Shahrukh. The book is preserved in three incomplete manuscripts, and no other Persian work on medicine quoted this book.

References 

15th-century Iranian physicians
Physicians from the Timurid Empire